Henan Jianye Women's Football Club is a Chinese women's football club that is currently participating in the Chinese Women's Super League. The team is based in Zhengzhou, Henan.

History
Founded in 1983 as Henan Women's Football Team, the team became professional in September 2015 and was renamed as Henan Huishang Female Football Club.

Players

First Team Squad

Notable players
 Lei Jiahui
 Lou Jiahui
 Onome Ebi
 Chinwendu Ihezuo

Results

Honours

Chinese Women's League One
 Runners-up: 2017

References

External links

Women's football clubs in China
Chinese Women's Super League clubs